Palić is a town in Serbia.

Palić or Palic may also refer to:

FK Palić, football club based in Palić, Serbia
Lake Palić, Serbia

Surname
Antun Palić (born 1988), Croatian football player
Avdo Palić (1958–1995), Bosnian military officer
Dave Palic, American football player
Petar Palić (born 1972), Croatian Roman Catholic prelate
Tea Palić (born 1991), Croatian alpine skier

See also